Below is a listing of the official release to date by the band The Fiery Furnaces.

Studio albums
Gallowsbird's Bark (2003)
Blueberry Boat (2004)
EP (2005)
Rehearsing My Choir (2005)
Bitter Tea (2006)
Widow City (2007)
I'm Going Away (2009)
Take Me Round Again (2009)

Live albums
Remember (2008)

Singles
"Crystal Clear" (2003)
"Tropical Ice-Land" (2004)
"Single Again" (2004)
"Benton Harbor Blues" (2006)
"The End Is Near" (2009)
"Down at the So and So on Somewhere" (2020)

Compilation appearances
Rough Trade Shops: Counter Culture 03 (2004)
Stop Me If You Think You've Heard This One Before (2003)
White Riot: A Tribute to the Clash Volume 1 (2003)
The Rough Trade Field Guide to Music, Volume One (2004)
Sunday Nights: The Songs of Junior Kimbrough (2005)
This Bird Has Flown - A 40th Anniversary Tribute to the Beatles' Rubber Soul (2005)

External links
  - Discography

Discographies of American artists
Rock music group discographies